A spreader is a device used for lifting containers and unitized cargo. The spreader is placed between the container and the lifting machine.

The spreader used for containers has a locking mechanism at each corner that attaches to the four corners of the container. A spreader can be used on a container crane, a straddle carrier and with any other machinery to lift containers. Spreader operation can be manual, semiautomatic or fully automatic.

See also
 Containerization
Intermodal container

External links
Earls Industries Quality Spreaders, Attachments, Fabricated Forks, & Related Equipment
Greenfield Products Automatic and manual container spreaders
Container Spreaders Handling equipment for all types containers

Port infrastructure